gubb was a Web-based list application that required no downloaded software. With gubb, users could create, manage and share an unlimited number of lists. gubb also offered a fully functional mobile Web application .

gubb was created in 2006 by former White House intern and Walt Disney Company executive Josh Weinstein and Peppercoin founding member Joe Bergeron.

External links 
  - Official gubb Website
 I've got a little list - USA Today, Angela Gunn
 Gubb your to do lists -  GigaOM, Om Malik
 Outstanding Online Application for Lists -  Web Worker Daily, Judi Sohn
 Write it down: Americans ‘addicted’ to lists -  Central Valley Business Times
 Easy List Making with Gubb -  AppScout, Kyle Monson

Web applications
Personal information managers